Bernd Mayländer (born 29 May 1971 in Waiblingen) is a German racing driver and current Formula One safety car driver.

Racing career 
Bernd started his career in karting sport at the end of the 1980s. In the following years he made his way to the Formula Ford, the Porsche Carrera Cup and the original DTM. In 2000, he won the 24 Hours Nürburgring in a Porsche 911 GT3-R. When the Deutsche Tourenwagen Masters (DTM) series was resumed in 2000, he drove for Mercedes-Benz. He raced for Mercedes in DTM from 2001 to 2004, having won one race at Hockenheimring in 2001.

Safety car driver in Formula One 

Mayländer is the safety car driver for all Formula One races. He has driven the Formula One safety car since 2000 with very few exceptions, such as the 2001 Canadian Grand Prix, when he was injured and was replaced by Marcel Fässler and the 2002 United States Grand Prix when he was replaced by Irish racing driver Damien Faulkner.

As of 2018, Mayländer had led over 700 laps in Formula One during his career.

Other 
In May 2005, he was one of six Mercedes-Benz drivers taking part in a record drive.

Racing record

Complete Deutsche Tourenwagen Meisterschaft/Masters results

† Driver did not finish, but was classified as he completed 90% of the winner's race distance.
1 - Shanghai was a non-championship round.

Complete International Touring Car Championship

† Driver did not finish the race, but was classified as he completed over 90% of the race distance.

24 Hours of Le Mans results

References

External links 

Profile at Formula1.com

1971 births
Living people
People from Waiblingen
Sportspeople from Stuttgart (region)
Formula One people
German racing drivers
Deutsche Tourenwagen Masters drivers
24 Hours of Le Mans drivers
Racing drivers from Baden-Württemberg
Porsche Supercup drivers
Mercedes-AMG Motorsport drivers
Team Rosberg drivers
Nürburgring 24 Hours drivers
Porsche Carrera Cup Germany drivers